Paul Ernest Adolph (August 4, 1901 – 17 June 1972) was an American medical missionary born in Philadelphia, Pennsylvania. Paul served the China Inland Mission, now OMF International, from 1929 to 1941 then served in the US Army Medical Corps as a Major from 1941 to 1945. Paul returned to China to serve one last time from 1946 to 1949. After returning to the United States in 1949, he worked preparing missionaries for overseas work and restoring their health after contracting diseases. Once retired, Paul served at his sons' hospitals in central Ethiopia and Bangladesh. Paul opened two hospitals in Luan, Shansi and in Kaifeng, Henan and played a key role in the negotiations with Japanese military that kept hospitals open to Chinese populations during the Sino-Japanese war.

Early life and education 
Paul Adolph was born as the second son to Willhelma and William Adolph on August 4, 1901 in Philadelphia, Pennsylvania. He was younger brother to Edward (1895-1986) and William (1890-1958).

Paul was raised to speak German by his father who had been an engraver in the black forest of Germany. He attended Central High School in Philadelphia and graduated in 1919 speaking English, German, Latin, Greek, and Hebrew. Paul began his undergraduate studies at the University of Pennsylvania but transferred to Wheaton College, where he graduated from in 1924 with a B.S. in chemistry and a B.A. in Greek.

Paul studied medicine at the University of Pennsylvania School of Medicine where he attempted to master as many specialties as he could in anticipation of not having specialists in the missionary field. When Paul became sick with Tuberculosis at the end of his last year, the school awarded him his M.D. in 1927 despite him being sent to recover at Edward Livingston Trudeau's tuberculosis sanatorium in New York. While at the sanatorium, he recovered and eventually joined the medical staff, taking on responsibilities in patient care.

Medical work  
Paul left the United States for China with the China Inland Mission for the first time in 1929. When he arrived in Beijing, then Peiking, he was able to visit his brother who was a professor of biochemistry in Beijing.

Upon arrival in China, Paul was first to spend six months at a language school in the Anhui province studying the Chinese language. After the six months, he proceeded to his residency at a hospital in Linfen in the province of Shanxi. Following a year of residency, Paul was directed to open a 100-bed hospital in Luan, now Changzhi, in southeastern Shanxi. The missionaries that had previously worked in this region were no longer there as they had fled during the Boxer Rebellion.

At the hospital in Changzhi, Paul was the only doctor and carried out mostly surgical procedures. Initially, Paul was received apprehensively in Luan and often called "foreign devil" by the children. He and his team made many efforts to integrate, such as wearing traditional Chinese clothing instead of American clothes. Patients at the hospital came from as far as 50 miles carried, walking, by wheelbarrow, or by cart. In his book, Surgery Speaks to China, Paul recounts having to treat many cases of tuberculosis due to the unsanitary living conditions. Many times patients came with illnesses that had progressed beyond treatment and amputations were necessary. In these cases, the hospital had a carpenter on staff to build wooden legs. Paul also reports many surgical cases to correct deformities, such as "hare-lip", or cleft palate.

One of the goals of Paul while in China was to improve sanitation among midwives as they were the primary means of delivering babies throughout the region. He did so by observing deliveries with midwives and advising other midwives to practice already present, more sanitary methods such as burning the umbilical chord to sever it instead of using an unsanitary tool.

He also attempted to mend the sanitation issue by providing bathtubs at the hospital for patients and the public to use, as bathing was not a priority throughout the community. This combined with propaganda and example, especially using Paul's infant son, proved to be effective. Paul also made arrangements with poor patients to facilitate their care including providing housing until complete recovery and low, fixed costs. While in Changzhi, he would tour the province with his wife, son, a small medical team, and equipment in donated cars to treat people in rural areas. Clinics and operating theatres were set up in tents and many surgeries were able to be performed.

In spring of 1936, after the birth of his second son, Paul returned to the United States where he took a year of graduate courses at the University of Pennsylvania School of Medicine. After this and a course in general surgery, Paul stayed to participate in research on sulfanilamide.

In November 1937, Paul returned to China and worked in Shunteh (Xingtai), Hebei because his return to Changzhi was delayed by the fighting of the Sino-Japanese war. Upon his return, Paul practiced mostly war medicine and extensively used the delimiting tourniquet. He later published a paper on the use of the delimiting tourniquet in wartime in China and accredits many survivals to its use. In September, 1938 he was able to return to Changzhi but without his family. That winter, Paul traveled to Liaochao to partner with the Red Cross in opening a hospital that needed a doctor.

In 1939 a reoccurrence of tuberculosis caused Paul to have to return to his family in Chefoo, now Yantai, for a five-month rest period. After this rest period, Paul began his journey back to Changzhi. Before arriving to Changzhi he received news they had been overtaken by Japanese forces and went to work at a hospital in Kaifeng instead. Here, he was free to practice as long as he cooperated with both Japanese and Chinese troops. Paul continued to practice here until he returned to the United States in 1941.

When in the United States, Paul practiced in industrial surgery in Detroit for six months and nine months as an associate to another surgeon in private practice before being commissioned to the Army Medical Corps. Major Adolph served in Scotland, France, and England as a US Army Surgeon before being  stationed at Fort Sheridan as Chief of Surgery in 1943. After a year at Fort Sheridan, Paul was once again stationed in England and served as a Chief of Surgical Service at a general hospital. Major Adolph then served as a supervisor to eight German prisoner of war hospitals in France. The hospitals were for German patients and had German doctors, but were overseen by Americans. In a letter, Paul reported that "Nazism has hindered the progress in the medical field" and new methods frequently had to be taught to the German doctors.

In August 1946, Paul and his family had returned to Shanghai to continue working with the China Inland Mission. He became the school physician for the Shanghai American School, a professor of surgery at the St. Johns Medical School, the director of the China Inland Mission's medical work in China, and the operator of a hospital in Shanghai. He also worked in a clinic for the poor operated in front of his own compound.

Upon return to the United States, Paul practiced in Kentucky before being debilitated by a stroke and a third occurrence of tuberculosis in 1950. For twenty years Paul continued his involvement in the medical mission community in Chicago by preparing missionaries for working overseas and keeping them healthy after having contracted diseases abroad. After retirement, Paul practiced at his son Harold's mission hospital in Ethiopia and his son Robert's mission hospital in Bangladesh.

Personal life 
Paul married Vivian A. Adolph in June 1931 in Beijing and they honeymooned together in a nearby mountain range before being forced to evacuate due to war violence. They had two sons,  Robert (b. 12/14/1935) and Harold (b. 12/11/1932), who followed in their father's footsteps and entered the mission field as doctors.

While serving in China, Paul was curious of the history of Shen Nung, the father of Chinese medicine and the divine husbandman. He made trips to the Taihang Mountain to explore the temple and speak to the monks.

Later life and death 
Toward the end of his career, Paul spent time advising the China Inland Mission and working with his sons in the mission field. He accompanied his sons to sites in Ethiopia and Bangladesh, where they established hospitals. While working in Ethiopia, Paul died at the age of 70 in June 1972.

Legacy 
Paul established the Sixth People's Hospital of Shanghai through his work with the China Inland Mission. Initially with only 100 beds, the Sixth People's Hospital is now 1,650-bed modern teaching hospital. While working in China during wartime, Paul was responsible for negotiating with both sides to continue providing medical care to communities caught in the middle of the fighting. Paul also helped communities. He also assisted in founding his sons' hospitals in Bangladesh under the Sudan Interior Mission and southern Ethiopia.

In 1959 Paul was awarded the Distinguished Service to Society Award by Wheaton College, his alma mater.

Publications 
 Preoperative Measures Used in War Surgery in China with Special Reference to the Delimiting Tourniquet. Published in 1944
 Surgery Speaks to China. Published by China Inland Mission 1945
 Health Shall Spring Forth (Release From Tension). Published by Moody Press 1956 
 Triumphant Living. Published by Moody Press  1959
 Missionary Health Manual. Published by: Moody Press 1964
 The Physical and Emotional Stress of Missionary Work. Published by Interdenominational Foreign Mission Association 1965

References

1901 births
1972 deaths
American physicians
Medical missionaries
United States Army Medical Corps officers
Perelman School of Medicine at the University of Pennsylvania alumni
20th-century Chinese physicians